Lake High School may refer to:

 Lake High School (Millbury, Ohio), a public high school
 Lake Middle/High School, a public high school in Uniontown, Ohio